Domina may refer to:

 Female form of Dominus (title)
 Domina (grape), a type of grape
 Domina (Image Comics), an Image Comics character from the Spawn series
 Domina (TV series), a 2021 UK historical-drama television series
 Domina (video game), a gladiator management game by DolphinBarn
 Domina, one of the Neo (Marvel Comics species)
 Domina a synonym for the fly genus Psilopa

People with the surname
 David Domina (born 1950), American politician

See also
 Dominia (disambiguation)
 Dominatrix